The 6 Hours of São Paulo was a sports car race held at the Autódromo José Carlos Pace in São Paulo, Brazil. It was created for the FIA World Endurance Championship, and was held for the first time on 15 September 2012 as the fifth round of the 2012 World Endurance Championship. The race was discontinued for 2015 as the Interlagos paddock buildings were undergoing renovations and a suitable date could not be secured. The race was originally set to return in 2020 as the 5th round of the 2019-20 FIA World Endurance Championship, but was subsequently cancelled, due to the event promoter failing to meet contractual obligations, and it was replaced by a round at the Circuit of the Americas.

Results

References

 
Recurring sporting events established in 2012
Sports car races